At the 1948 Summer Olympics, 16 wrestling events were contested, for all men. There were eight weight classes in Greco-Roman wrestling and eight classes in freestyle wrestling. The freestyle competitions were held from July 29 to July 31, 1948 and the Greco-Roman events were held from August 3 to August 6, 1948.

Medal summary

Greco-Roman

Freestyle

Participating nations
A total of 219 wrestlers from 29 nations competed at the London Games:

 
 
 
 
 
 
 
 
 
 
 
 
 
 
 
 
 
 
 
 
 
 
 
 
 
 
 
 

N.B. - Pakistan sent four wrestlers, but they could not compete as they had been mistakenly entered for the Greco-Roman style and not freestyle.

Medal table

See also
List of World and Olympic Champions in men's freestyle wrestling
List of World and Olympic Champions in Greco-Roman wrestling

References

External links
 

 
1948 Summer Olympics events
1948
International wrestling competitions hosted by the United Kingdom
1948 in sport wrestling